Isaiah Rodgers Sr. (born January 7, 1998) is an American football cornerback and kick returner for the Indianapolis Colts of the National Football League (NFL). He played college football at UMass. Isaiah Rodgers Sr. is a father of Isaiah Rodgers Jr. & Maliyah Rodgers.

College career
Rodgers was named to Pro Football Focus' First-team All-American Team as a senior cornerback that could be moved to deep safety in special packages. In that season Rodgers returned 53 kickoffs for 1,295 yards. On defense, he made 42 total tackles, four interceptions including one returned for a touchdown, ten passes defended and one forced fumble and fumble recovery. During his college career, Rodgers compiled 125 total tackles (9.5 for a loss) with 11 interceptions including three  returned for a touchdown, and four fumble recoveries and forced fumbles. On special teams, he posted 99 total kickoff returns for 2,338 yards (23.6 average), in addition to 21 punt returns for 156 yards (7.4 average) and one touchdown. Rodgers held his own Pro Day after his senior season showcasing his defensive diversity at safety and defensive back; he ran a 4.28–second 40-yard dash.

Professional career
Rodgers Sr. was selected by the Indianapolis Colts with the 211th pick in the sixth round of the 2020 NFL Draft in a pick acquired in a trade with the New York Jets in exchange for Quincy Wilson. Rodgers scored his first career touchdown on a 101-yard kick return in a Week 5 loss to the Cleveland Browns.

References

External links
Indianapolis Colts bio
UMass Minutemen bio

Living people
American football cornerbacks
Indianapolis Colts players
UMass Minutemen football players
Players of American football from Tampa, Florida
1998 births